Mecklenburgische Seenplatte I – Vorpommern-Greifswald II is an electoral constituency (German: Wahlkreis) represented in the Bundestag. It elects one member via first-past-the-post voting. Under the current constituency numbering system, it is designated as constituency 16. It is located in southeast Mecklenburg-Vorpommern, comprising the most of the Vorpommern-Greifswald district and southeast parts of the Mecklenburgische Seenplatte district.

Mecklenburgische Seenplatte I – Vorpommern-Greifswald II was created for the 2013 federal election. Since 2021, it has been represented by Erik von Malottki of the Social Democratic Party (SPD).

Geography
Mecklenburgische Seenplatte I – Vorpommern-Greifswald II is located in southeast Mecklenburg-Vorpommern. As of the 2021 federal election, it comprises all of the Vorpommern-Greifswald district with the exception of municipality of Greifswald and the Amt of Landhagen, as well as the municipalities of Feldberger Seenlandschaft and Neubrandenburg and the Ämter of Friedland, Neverin, Stargarder Land, and Woldegk from the Mecklenburgische Seenplatte district.

History
Mecklenburgische Seenplatte I – Vorpommern-Greifswald II was created in 2013 and contained parts of the abolished constituencies of Greifswald – Demmin – Ostvorpommern and Neubrandenburg – Mecklenburg-Strelitz – Uecker-Randow. Its borders have not changed since its creation.

Members
The constituency was won by the Christian Democratic Union (CDU) in 2013, and represented by Matthias Lietz. He was succeeded by party fellow Philipp Amthor in 2017. Erik von Malottki won the constituency for the Social Democratic Party (SPD) in 2021.

Election results

2021 election

2017 election

2013 election

References

Federal electoral districts in Mecklenburg-Western Pomerania
2013 establishments in Germany
Constituencies established in 2013